Doucett is a French language surname and a variant of Doucet. Notable people with the name include:

 George Doucett (1897–1974), Canadian politician from Ontario
 John Doucett (died 1726), Lieutenant Governor of Nova Scotia
 Linda Doucett (born 1954) American actress and model
 Rayburn Doucett (born 1943), Canadian merchant and politician from New Brunswick
 Raymond Doucett (born 1907), Canadian wholesale grocer and politician from New Brunswick

See also
 Doucette, surname
 Doucet, surname

French-language surnames